Jai Sriram is a 2013 Telugu, action film directed by Balaji N. Sai. The film had Uday Kiran and Reshma Rathore in lead roles with Adithya Menon as the villain. This film happened to be Uday Kiran's last proper film to date, just a year before his death as he had an unreleased film released posthumously (but it got shelved and became unofficial, due to his untimely demise)!

Plot
Sriram Srinivas (Uday Kiran) is a tough and honest cop. He values his job and fights for justice and the protection of society. His moral values and ethics bring him into direct conflict with Chintamani and his son (Aditya Menon). Chintamani is a corrupt politician who runs an illegal organ trade racket by exploiting orphans and homeless people.
Our hero Sriram Srinivas decides to put an end to Chintamani's game. He even goes against the Police Commissioner (Chalapathi Rao)’s orders. But he faces some unexpected difficulties in the form of dishonest colleagues.
Sriram’s life is destroyed. His family is killed. There is nothing left for him.
That is when our hero decides to take revenge. He starts hunting down Chintamani and his gang. He does not spare his corrupt colleagues as well. What happens in the end and how Sriram achieves his objectives is what ‘Jai Sriram’ is all about.

Cast
 Uday Kiran as Sriram Srinivas
 Reshma Rathore as Reshma
 Gautam Raju as Chintamani
 Adithya Menon as Adi Narayana
 Nagineedu
 M. S. Narayana
 Chalapati Rao as Police Commissioner
 Thagubothu Ramesh
 Banerjee
 Fish Venkat
 Sana
 Harish Kalyan as Sidhu
 Sonam Singh

Soundtrack

Reviews 

The film's music was released to positive reviews, and achieved the platinum disc function. The film was released to moderate reviews. The Times of India gave the movie good review appreciating the cinematography and Uday Kiran's performance.

References

External links
https://web.archive.org/web/20140110082541/http://www.eenaducinema.com/videos/actors/uday-kiran-as-jai-sriram/413.html

2013 films
2010s Telugu-language films